Uttarapalli is a village panchayat in Kothavalasa mandal of Vizianagaram district in Andhra Pradesh, India.

Assembly Constituency
Uttarapalli is an assembly constituency in Andhra Pradesh.

List of Elected Members:
1978 - Kakarlapudi Vijaya Raghava Satyanarayana Padmanabha Raju
1983, 1985, 1989, 1994 and 1999 - Kolla Appala Naidu
2004 - Pudi Mangapathi Rao

References

Villages in Vizianagaram district